Thakor Laxmanji Punjaji (born 1967 or 1968) is an Indian politician who has served in the Gujarat Legislative Assembly since 2022. A member of the Bharatiya Janata Party, Punjaji represents the Kalol constituency.

References 

Living people
Gujarat MLAs 2022–2027
Bharatiya Janata Party politicians from Gujarat
Members of the Gujarat Legislative Assembly
Year of birth missing (living people)